This is a list of VHS and DVD releases based on the animated series Bob the Builder.

UK home videos

Original series

 Scoop Saves the Day and Other Stories
 Buffalo Bob and Other Stories
 Naughty Spud and Other Stories
 Bob's White Christmas and Other Stories
 Mucky Muck and Other Stories
 Pilchard's Breakfast and Other Stories
 Trailer Travis and Other Stories
 Scarecrow Dizzy and Other Stories
 Roley and the Rock Star and Other Stories
 Skateboard Spud and Other Stories
 Pilchard Steals the Show and Other Stories
 Bob's Animal Friends
 Bob's Winning Team
 Speedy Skip and Other Stories
 Teamwork Challenge
 Feast of Fun
 The Great Race / Scoop the Disco Digger and Other Stories

Project: Build It

 Bob's Big Plan
 Chip Off the Old Block
 Let's Scram!
 Super Speedy Benny
 Spud's Bumper Harvest and Other Stories
 Lofty the Star and Other Stories
 Bob's Top Team and Other Stories
 The Three Musketrucks
 Adventures in Bobland Bay
 Radio Bob

Ready, Steady, Build!
 Can-Do Crew
 Starting from Scratch
 Here to Help
 Seaside Adventures
 Super Scrambler
 Can We Fix It? Yes We Can!

Specials

Original series
 A Christmas to Remember
 The Live Show
 The Knights of Can-A-Lot
 Snowed Under: The Bobblesberg Winter Games

Project: Build It

 When Bob Became a Builder
 Built to Be Wild
 Scrambler to the Rescue
 Race to the Finish

Ready, Steady, Build!
 The Legend of the Golden Hammer
 The Big Dino Dig

Reboot series 
• Bob the Builder: Mega Machines the Movie

Australian Home Video

DVD

ABC DVD

Original Series

 ABC For Kids: Let’s Sing and Dance
 Skateboard Spud
 Pilchard Steals the Show
 Roley and the Rockstar
 ABC For Kids: Just for Fun
 Teamwork Challange
 Scoop the Disco Digger
 Bob’s Winning Team
 HiT Favourites: Winter Collection
 HiT Favourites: Active Collection
 HiT Favourites: It’s Party Time!
 The Complete 1st Series
 The Complete 2nd Series
 The Complete 3rd Series
 The Complete 4th Series
 The Best of Bob the Builder Volume 1
 My First Bob the Builder with Scoop
 My First Bob the Builder with Muck
 My First Bob the Builder with Dizzy
 HiT Entertainment: Frosty Friends
 HiT Entertainment: Trick or Treat Tales

Project: Build It

 Bob’s Big Plan
 Chip of the Old Block
 Benny’s Back
 Put it Together
 Scoop’s Recruit
 Muck’s Convoy
 Dizzy’s Sleepover
 Scrambler to the Rescue
 ABC For Kids Favourites 1
 Bashing Crashing Benny
 HiT Favourites: Spooky Collection
 Adventures in Bobland Bay
 ABC For Kids Favourites 3
 The Best of Bob the Builder Volume 2
 On Site: Roads and Bridges
 On Site: Homes and Playgrounds
 HiT Entertainment: Back to School

Ready, Steady, Build!

 Can Do Crew
 Starting From Scratch
 ABC For Kids DVD Sampler
 Here Comes Muck
 The Dream Room
 ABC For Kids: Get Active
 ABC For Kids: Let’s Get Creative!

Reboot Series

 Let’s Build Together
 Building Fun at the Zoo

Specials

Original Series

 A Christmas to Remember
 The Knights of Can-a-Lot
 Snowed Under

Project: Build It

 Built to be Wild
 Race to the Finish

Ready, Steady, Build!

 The Legend of the Golden Hammer
 The Big Dino Dig

Reboot Series

 Mega Machines

Universal Pictures Home Entertainment
 20 Episodes Can-Do Crew Pack (coming soon)

US Home Video

Original Series

VHS and DVD

 Can We Fix It?
 To the Rescue!
 Pets in a Pickle
 Bob's White Christmas
 The Big Game
 Busy Bob & Silly Spud
 Celebrate with Bob
 Bob Saves the Day!
 Can-Do Crew!
 Digging for Treasure
 Building Friendships
 Free Bonus Video
 Teamwork!
 Teamwork! bonus video
 Tool Power!
 Dig! Lift! Haul!
 Machine Team Fun
 Building Yard Adventures
 Yes We Can!
 Help Is On the Way!
 Getting the Job Done!
 The Best of Bob the Builder
 The Ultimate Can-Do Crew Collection

Favorite Adventures Series

 Scoop's Favorite Adventures
 Muck's Favorite Adventures
 Bob's Favorite Adventures
 Dizzy's Favorite Adventures
 Roley's Favorite Adventures
 Lofty's Favorite Adventures
 Ultimate Adventure Collection

Digital Releases

 Build It Big!
 Animal Adventures
 Building Buddies

Project: Build It

VHS and DVD

 Bob's Big Plan
 Build It and They Will Come
 When Bob Became a Builder
 Hold Onto Your Hard Hats
 New to the Crew
 Top Team
 Call in the Crew
 The Three Musketrucks
 Building Bobland Bay
 Let's Build the Beach
 Truck Teamwork
 Built for Fun
 The Best of Bob the Builder

Digital Releases

 Hammer Time!
 Construction Chaos
 Let's Build!

Specials

 The Knights of Can-A-Lot
 A Christmas to Remember
 The Live Show
 Snowed Under: The Bobblesberg Winter Games
 Bob's Big Plan
 When Bob Became a Builder
 Built to Be Wild
 Scrambler to the Rescue
 Race to the Finish

Blockbuster Exclusive 

 Nice Work, Bob!
 Bob's Busy Day
 Fun & Games
 Bob's Friends and Family
 Christmas with Bob and the Crew

Home video releases
Lists of home video releases